This article aims to include information on all recordings of Beethoven's Symphony No. 3 that have ever been available to the public.

External links

Archived copy of Eric Grunin's Eroica Discography (2007)

Symphony discographies
03 Discography